Austrobatrachus foedus, the puzzled toadfish, is a species of toadfish found along the Atlantic Coast of South Africa.

References

Batrachoididae
Fish of the Atlantic Ocean
Marine fish of South Africa
Fish described in 1947